Flight 608 may refer to:

United Airlines Flight 608, crashed on 24 October 1947
KLM Flight 608, crashed on 23 August 1954

0608